Simpson Desert is a desert located in central Australia.

 Simpson Desert  may also refer to the following:

Simpson Desert, South Australia, a locality
Simpson Desert Conservation Park, a protected area in South Australia now part of Munga-Thirri–Simpson Desert National Park
Simpson Desert Important Bird Area, a designation associated with protected areas within the Simpson Desert
Simpson Desert National Park, a protected area in Queensland now  called Munga-Thirri National Park
Simpson Desert Regional Reserve, a former protected area in South Australia known as Munga-Thirri–Simpson Desert Regional Reserve, now part of Munga-Thirri—Simpson Desert National Park

See also
Simpson (disambiguation)